Bognor Regis War Memorial Hospital is a health facility in Shripney Road, Bognor Regis, West Sussex, England. It is managed by Sussex Community NHS Foundation Trust.

History
The facility, which was built as a lasting memorial to soldiers who died in the First World War, opened in 1919. It joined the National Health Service in 1948. Rheumatology staff at the hospital received a Healthcare Champions Award in 2008.

References

External links
Official site

Hospital buildings completed in 1919
1919 establishments in England
Hospitals established in 1919
Hospitals in West Sussex
NHS hospitals in England
Bognor Regis